Hivos. Humanist Institute for Development Cooperation is an international cooperation organization guided by humanist values. Hivos provides support to civil society organizations working in Africa, Latin America, the Middle East and Asia.

History
Hivos was founded in 1968. The founders held the conviction that development work should be secular, as true cooperation presumes respect for differing beliefs. In the organization’s first publication, the founders wrote that “necessary changes should spring from communities themselves – from people at the base of society.”

In the 1980s and 1990s, Hivos was one of the first major Dutch NGOs that opened offices in the Global South to work closely with its civil society partners, beneficiaries and other stakeholders.

.

Organization

Location 
Hivos' Global Office is in The Hague. Hivos currently works in 40 countries and has regional hubs in Latin America, East Africa, Southern Africa and North Africa and the Middle East and North Africa (MENA). Hivos has handed over its Southeast Asia activities to the recently formed local NGO Yayasan Hivos in Indonesia.

At the beginning of 2021, 25 percent of Hivos staff worked at the Global Office in The Hague, with the remaining 75 percent working at regional and country offices.

Governance 
Hivos is managed by the Executive Board, made up of the Chief Executive Officer (CEO) and the Chief Operations Officer (COO). The Management Team consists of the directors of the regional hubs and a few other management positions.  A seven-member Supervisory Council functions as employer of the EB and approves Hivos’ budgets and annual accounts, as well as any major strategic decisions Hivos takes.

Hivos has the CBF certification.

Vision and values

Mission 
Hivos’ mission is to amplify and connect voices that promote social and environmental justice and challenge power imbalances. Hivos particularly empowers marginalized rightsholders to raise their voice and demand freedom of choice.

Vision 
Hivos firmly believes in every person’s right to live in freedom and dignity, to enjoy equal opportunities, and to influence decisions made regarding the changes they want to see in their lives, communities and country.

Core values 

 Freedom and dignity
 Responsible citizenship
 Self-determination and diversity
 Equality and justice
 Sustainable use of our planet’s resources

Impact areas 
Hivos currently focuses on these three areas:

 Gender Equality, Diversity and Inclusion
 Climate Justice
 Civic Rights in a Digital Age

References

International development agencies
Humanist associations
Non-profit organisations based in the Netherlands
Funding bodies of the Netherlands
1968 establishments in the Netherlands
Organizations established in 1968
Organisations based in The Hague